Wanted is a 2008 American action thriller film directed by Timur Bekmambetov and written by Michael Brandt, Derek Haas, and Chris Morgan, loosely based on the comic book miniseries by Mark Millar and J. G. Jones. The film stars James McAvoy, Morgan Freeman, Angelina Jolie, Terence Stamp, Thomas Kretschmann, Common, and Chris Pratt. Its plot revolves around Wesley Gibson (McAvoy), a frustrated account manager who discovers that he is the son of a professional assassin and decides to join the Fraternity, a secret society in which his father worked.

Universal Pictures acquired the adaptation rights from Millar in 2004, and while the eventual script drifted from the comic book supervillain mythos in the original miniseries, he was content to see most of the comic's darker content retained. Production began in April 2007, with filming in the Czech Republic, Budapest, and the story's main setting, Chicago. Bekmambetov's production company, Bazelevs Production, provided the majority of the film's visual effects. Danny Elfman scored the film, employing a guitar-based musical score.

Wanted opened on June 27, 2008 to generally favorable reviews, with praise for its fast pacing and stylized action scenes, and grossed $342 million worldwide. A sequel was announced shortly after the film's release, but ultimately stalled in development.

Plot

In Chicago, Wesley Gibson works at a dead-end desk job with an overbearing boss, takes medication for panic attacks, and lives with his abrasive girlfriend Cathy who cheats on him with his co-worker and best friend, Barry. One evening, Wesley is told by a woman named Fox that his recently murdered father was an assassin, and the killer, Cross, is now hunting him. When Cross and Fox engage in a shootout, Wesley panics and is pursued by Cross. Fox flips Wesley into her car and then executes an escape. Wesley awakens in a factory surrounded by Fox and other assassins. The group's leader, Mr. Sloan, forces Wesley at gunpoint to shoot the wings off of several flies, which he does, much to Wesley's shock. Sloan explains that Wesley's panic attacks are actually a rare ability that allows him to produce massive amounts of adrenaline, slowing his perception of his surroundings and granting him superhuman strength and speed. He reveals that Wesley's father, as well as Cross, were members of the Fraternity, a society of assassins that maintains balance in the world. Sloan wants to train him so that he may help kill Cross.

A panicked Wesley leaves the building and awakens the next morning in his apartment. He discovers that his bank account now contains $3.6 million. Filled with new confidence, he insults his boss in front of the whole office and hits Barry in the face with a keyboard. Fox, waiting for Wesley, chauffeurs him to the Fraternity headquarters, a repurposed textile mill. Wesley trains under the Fraternity's cruel tutelage, learning to control his abilities; Fox teaching him speed, the Gunsmith teaching him marksmanship, such as curving a bullet, the Butcher teaching him hand-to-hand combat, the Exterminator teaching him explosives, and the Repairman teaching him pain resistance. When his training is complete, Sloan shows him the "Loom of Fate", which has served for 1,000 years in giving coded names of Fraternity targets through errors in the fabric. The Loom identifies those who will create evil and chaos in the future, with Sloan responsible for interpreting the code. Fox reveals that, her father was a judge, and his defendant hired a sadistic hitman who made her watch as he burned her father alive. When she later joined the Fraternity, she learned the hitman's name appeared in the Loom before he killed her father, but a member refused to kill him, which has made her a devote follower of the Fraternity's code.

After several successful missions, and dumping Cathy with the help of Fox, Wesley has an unexpected shootout with Cross, where he accidentally kills the Exterminator. Cross shoots and injures Wesley in the shoulder. Sloan grants Wesley's wish to avenge his father and sends him after Cross—but then secretly gives Fox a mission to kill Wesley, saying that his name has come up in the Loom. Analyzing the bullet from his shoulder, Wesley realizes that Cross had used a traceable bullet for the first time (as his previous kills were all untraceable). Wesley traces it to a man named Pekwarsky. He and Fox capture Pekwarsky, who arranges a meeting with Cross. When Wesley faces Cross alone on a moving train, Fox crashes a car into the train, causing a derailment. While Cross saves Wesley from falling, Wesley shoots him. Before dying, Cross reveals that he is Wesley's real father. Fox confirms this and explains that Wesley was recruited because he was the only person Cross would not kill. As Fox prepares to shoot Wesley, he shoots the train window below him and Cross, causing the men to free fall into the river. Wesley is retrieved by Pekwarsky, who takes him to Cross' apartment (which is located just opposite Wesley's) and explains that Sloan started manufacturing targets for profit after his name appeared in the Loom. Cross discovered the truth, went rogue, and started killing Fraternity members to keep them away from his son.

Pekwarsky departs, stating that Cross wished Wesley a life free of violence. Wesley, however, decides to kill Sloan in order to finish what his father started. Wesley attacks the base using explosive rats (a tactic he learned from the Exterminator), killing surviving Fraternity assassins in a massive shootout, including the Repairman and the Butcher. Entering Sloan's office, he is surrounded by Fox, Gunsmith, and the remaining assassins. Wesley discloses Sloan's deception, to which Sloan admits his name appeared in the loom alongside the names of those present, and that he had acted to protect them. He gives the members a choice: kill themselves, per the code, or kill Wesley and use their skills to control the world. As the others choose to kill him, Fox curves a bullet around the room, choosing to follow the code and kill everyone, including herself, but not before throwing her gun to Wesley, preventing him from saving her. Sloan escapes in the mayhem. Wesley, penniless again due to his bank account being wiped out by Sloan, apparently returns to his desk job. Sloan arrives to kill Wesley but is shocked when the person turns around and is revealed to be a decoy. Wesley kills Sloan with a sniper rifle from Cross' apartment miles away (just as Cross himself had done to a Fraternity assassin at the beginning of the film). Wesley states that he is taking back control of his life before turning to the audience and asking, "What the fuck have you done lately?"

Cast
 James McAvoy as Wesley Gibson, a meek 24-year-old who works in a cubicle but learns he is heir to a career as an assassin
 Angelina Jolie as Fox, an accomplished member of the Fraternity and zealous follower of their code who mentors Wesley
 Morgan Freeman as Mr. Sloan, leader of the Fraternity and former partner of Mr. X
 Thomas Kretschmann as Cross, a rogue assassin who has left the Fraternity
 Common as Earl Spellman / The Gunsmith, a professional gunman who trains others to use weapons
 Konstantin Khabensky as The Exterminator, an expert in explosives who makes bombs and attaches them to rats
 Marc Warren as The Repairman, an assassin who says he "breaks bad habits" by violently beating people
 Dato Bakhtadze as The Butcher, a knife-expert who trains Wesley in knife fighting
 Terence Stamp as Pekwarsky, a master in the science of killing. He operates as a rogue agent outside of The Fraternity and is also a bullet maker.
 David O'Hara as Mr. X, the first Fraternity member who is said to be the greatest assassin
 Chris Pratt as Barry, Wesley's co-worker and best friend
 Kristen Hager as Cathy, Wesley's unfaithful girlfriend
 Sophiya Haque as Puja
 Lorna Scott as Janice, Wesley's abusive boss

Production

Development and pre-production
The comic book miniseries Wanted (2003–04), by Mark Millar and J. G. Jones, came to the attention of Universal Pictures through executive Jeff Kirschenbaum, a comic book fan who sought a film adaptation that would be considered a "hard-R" and encouraged the studio to pick up the rights to the miniseries. By 2004, producer Marc Platt had gotten the film rights, and lobbied the studio to get Russian-Kazakh director Timur Bekmambetov, as Platt considered that the visual style and sensibility Bekmambetov showed in Night Watch (2004) and its sequel Day Watch (2006) fit Wanted in the sense that "the comic is dark and edgy but it also has an ironic, comedic tone beneath its violent action." In December 2005, Bekmambetov was hired to direct, his first English-language film, and writers Derek Haas and Michael Brandt were assigned the script. Bekmambetov described the original comic as "risky and very provocative", with "a twist and good characters", and declared that the thing that attracted him the most in Wanted was how it went through various film genres in its plot: "It's a comedy, a tragedy, a drama, a melodrama. Every scene, we change genres and that's why our movie is different."

Universal was initially reluctant on giving a potentially lucrative action film to a filmmaker who had never made an English-language film, but Platt convinced the studio that he could "create an environment that would allow Timur to be himself as a filmmaker and exercise his creative muscles."

Millar was unhappy with the first draft of the screenplay, considering the approach to be "too tame" and "a little bit Americanized" given he wanted "basically be the opposite of the Spider-Man movie, the idea of someone getting powers and realizing they can do what they want, then choosing the dark path." The author only started to support the direction the project was taking once Bekmambetov "came in with his Eastern European madness" and the intention of coming closer to the spirit of the book. Bekmambetov said that he would take liberty in adapting the comic book's world: "It's difficult for me to just follow. It's interesting for me to create. I feel a little bit different how this world has to be executed." In July 2006, screenwriter Chris Morgan was hired to revise the third act of Haas and Brandt's script.
Haas and Brandt returned to refine the character of Wesley Gibson, which they had established in their first draft.

Millar saw previsualized footage of the film and said that it exceeded his expectations for the adaptation. He described its first half as being close to the source comic, and added the ending was similar though it was relocated elsewhere from the comic's original setting. The superhero costumes in the series were also removed, with the exception of the leather attire worn by Wesley and Fox. Incidentally, this had been Millar's intent when writing the miniseries, but he and artist J. G. Jones had forgotten to. Millar said, "I wanted them to have those powers and then just wear those costumes for the initiation, but just for one panel. And then I forgot." Millar also stated that he would have liked to keep the supervillain mythos that dictates the original comic in the film. Millar was favorable to most of the changes in the storyline, which includes the story arc of the Fates issuing death orders in line with the series' original theme of predestination.

Casting

James McAvoy, who had screen-tested for the role early in 2006, was initially rejected because the studio was seeking an actor with conventional Hollywood leading man looks and physique. McAvoy was later recalled, being considered to be the "runt of the litter" among those who tested. According to McAvoy, "They [ultimately] wanted someone geeky."
McAvoy was cast in the role in October 2006.
The Scottish actor, who portrays an American in the film, worked out to improve his physique for the film's action scenes, and suffered several injuries during shooting which included a twisted ankle and an injured knee.

Angelina Jolie was cast in March 2007, after screenwriter Dean Georgaris rewrote the screenplay to tailor the role of Fox for her.
Mark Millar became much more enthusiastic about the project after learning that Jolie had accepted the role of Fox, saying "the only way they could have got a bigger star to play this role is if they'd hired Tom Cruise in drag." Jolie decided to make Fox seem "distant and unattainable" by having her silent in many scenes. She mentioned Clint Eastwood, who had recently directed her in the film Changeling, as a possible influence for this aspect of her performance. Furthermore, she asked for Fox to get killed, suggesting that "[i]f she was to find out she had killed people unjustly and was a part of something that wasn't fair, then she should take her own life."

Common became interested in the role of Gunsmith due to both the script and the prospect of working with McAvoy, Jolie, and Morgan Freeman. Common learned a great deal about firearms as preparation for the role, but said he is not a strong supporter of guns in real life. Konstantin Khabensky, who starred in Bekmambetov's Night Watch, was cast so that the director would have a familiar face around. British television veteran Marc Warren agreed to work in the film because he always wanted to be in a Hollywood blockbuster. Thomas Kretschmann originally intended to pick up the comic series after being cast, but Bekmambetov convinced him not to. Kretschmann said that he undertook "excessive gun training" to "make sure I look good and I look like I know what I'm doing". Kristen Hager originally auditioned for Fox, but accepted the role of Cathy, considering it "fun to play".

Filming
Location plate shooting took place in Chicago in April 2007. Several chase scenes, including one with a low flying helicopter, were shot in Chicago over two days, on Wacker Drive along the Chicago River, between Columbus Drive and LaSalle Street.
The opening scene was filmed using the Carbide & Carbon Building.
Production moved to the Czech Republic later in May, scheduled for 12 weeks of shooting, which included a scene in Pernštejn Castle. Using a former sugar factory in Prague, production designer John Myhre constructed a large textile factory as part of an industrial world, the setting of a mythological environment in which looms create fabrics that weavers interpret as assassination orders. Afterward, filming moved to Budapest, then returned to Chicago in August. While the actors performed many of their own stunts, with free running and parkour in some of the action scenes, and Angelina Jolie being actually strapped to the hood of a moving Dodge Viper, some of the especially high-risk sequences required digital doubles instead. Two full-sized train cars were built, a Chicago 'L' for a training scene where Fox and Wesley run atop a train, and a Czech Pendolino for the derailment, which was stationed in a gimbal equipped with hydraulics to allow the car to tilt and roll as the train crashed. The film originally had both an alternate opening and an alternate ending. The alternate opening, a flashback to ancient times describing the history of the Fraternity and the Loom of Fate, is available on the special edition DVD and Blu-ray.

Effects
Eight visual effects companies worked on the film's 800 effects shots, the majority of which was done by Bekmambetov's company Bazelevs Production. The first effects supervisor, Jon Farhat, was forced to withdraw from the production due to illness and was replaced by Stefen Fangmeier, who accepted the task as Wanted would only require four months of work. Once Fangmeier visited Bazelevs in Moscow, the effects were behind schedule, with only 12 finished composites out of the planned 500. Fangemier then brought two other supervisors to assist him in finishing many shots per week, so the job could get done by the deadline, a process the supervisor described as "a creative challenge on one hand, but on the other also a significant production challenge."  Another major contributor was London-based Framestore, responsible for the climactic train crash.

Music

Danny Elfman wrote the film's score, a job he accepted for being a fan of Bekmambetov's previous films. Considering the film to be a "weird, twisted, sarcastic thing," Elfman decided to make a guitar-based soundtrack, with the "nastiest sounds" and a "heavy metal approach." This included a rock song written and performed by Elfman, "The Little Things", which is featured throughout the film and on the end credits. The film score has been released on June 24, 2008 in North America by Lakeshore Records.

Release and promotion
Wanted was initially set to be released in cinemas on March 28, 2008. However, in December 2007, Universal Pictures announced that it would be pushing back the release date to June 27, 2008, as the studio considered that the film had the potential to stand among the blockbusters that would be released during the United States summer. The film's world premiere happened at the Los Angeles Film Festival on June 19, with Wanted acting as the festival opener. Given the Russian origin of the director, Universal released a specially localized version in Russia. The literary translation of the English dialog was written by the writer Sergey Lukyanenko. Several texts appearing on the screen and important for the plot were translated using CGI, without using subtitles or a voice-over translation. Several famous Russian actors, most of which were also in Bekmambetov's Night Watch and Day Watch, dubbed the main characters, and Konstantin Khabensky dubbed himself as The Exterminator. James McAvoy also provided some words in Russian for Wesley Gibson. Danny Elfman's song "The Little Things" received a version in Russian, performed by Elfman himself, and Bekmambetov also directed a music video for the band Delta as part of a viral marketing campaign in Russia.

Theatrical run
Wanted debuted in 3,185 theaters and earned $50,927,085 in its opening weekend, placing it at second place behind WALL-E. It was the best opening ever for an R-rated film released in June, only surpassed four years later by Prometheus and Ted. Overall, it achieved the seventh-highest opening weekend for an R-rated film, after The Matrix Reloaded, The Passion of the Christ, 300, Sex and the City, Hannibal and 8 Mile. Internationally, the film grossed $33 million on its opening weekend, breaking records in Russia and South Korea.  Wanted earned $134,508,551 in the United States and $207,954,512 internationally for a worldwide box office gross of $342,463,063 against a budget of $75 million.

Home video
Wanted was released on DVD and Blu-ray on December 2, 2008 in the U.S. Two versions were released, including a single-disc DVD and a two-disc edition of both the DVD and Blu-ray. A collectible two-disc gift-set DVD also included collectible postcards, a lenticular film cel in an acrylic frame, and a photobook of the Assassins. The DVD debuted at second place on the charts (behind The Chronicles of Narnia: Prince Caspian), and generated over $65 million in revenue by February 2009. The Blu-ray debuted at first place on the charts.

Video games
Sweden-based developer Stillfront AB launched a browser game based on Wanted in April 2008. The Wanted "Fan Immersion Game" was a massively multiplayer online role-playing game where players took the roles of Fraternity hitmen, performing assassination missions, upgrading weapons and ammunition, and creating alliances or rivalries with other players. A video game sequel to the events of the film, Wanted: Weapons of Fate, was released in March 2009. It was developed by GRIN, and published by Warner Bros. Interactive Entertainment for Microsoft Windows, PlayStation 3, and Xbox 360.

Reception

Reviews of Wanted were positive. The review aggregation website Rotten Tomatoes gives the film a 71% approval rating based on 209 critics, with a rating average of 6.60/10 and the consensus, "Wanted is stylish, energetic popcorn fare with witty performances from Angelina Jolie (playing an expert assassin), James McAvoy, and Morgan Freeman that help to distract from its absurdly over-the-top plot." It has a score of 64 out of 100 on Metacritic (based on 38 reviews), indicating "generally favorable reviews." Audiences polled by CinemaScore during Wanted opening weekend gave the film an average grade of B+ on an A+-to-F scale.

Roger Ebert of Ebert & Roeper wrote "Wanted slams the pedal to the metal and never slows down. Here's an action picture that's exhausting in its relentless violence and its ingenuity in inventing new ways to attack, defend, ambush and annihilate". Richard Roeper wrote, "It's made for fans of films that really just want to see some great visuals, some amazing sequences and some terrific performances."

Lisa Schwarzbaum of Entertainment Weekly encapsulated many critics' views, writing that "Wanted is kind of unintelligible and idiotic. Also kind of nasty and brutish. And also undeniably kind of fun..." Likewise, Tom Long of The Detroit News wrote, "Wanted may be the most absolutely stone bonkers, crazy-good movie of the century. Or it may be a gargantuan piece of trash. Chances are it's a combination of the two. But man, does it rock." Claudia Puig of USA Today found the "thrilling stunts and hyperkinetic action scenes [to be] the undisputed stars of this surprisingly entertaining film."

Conversely, John Rosenblatt of The Austin Chronicle denounced those same attributes, saying, "If Maxim magazine ever decides to branch out into filmmaking, Wanted is just the kind of ear-throttling nonsense it's bound to produce". David Fear of Time Out New York called it "the cinematic equivalent of an energy drink. The film keeps artificially pumping your adrenal glands with mindless, malnutritional sensations, only to leave you crampy and cranky minutes later. ...[T]his exercise in ultraviolence then insults us by having a beaten, bloodied McAvoy inform viewers that he used to be a loser 'just like all of you.
Frank Lovece of Film Journal International, one of few mainstream critics to have read the comic-book miniseries, wrote that the film compared poorly with the source material. Noting that the hero in the comic goes even further, "breaking the fourth wall and positioning himself so that he's 'prison-raping' and taunting the reader for having liked the series", Lovece found that, "[w]hile Millar may have contempt for his readers—and, by extension, the medium in which he works—at least he has his own vision, and gets it across with style and wit"; qualities that, in Lovece's opinion, the movie lacked.

In the comics press, Erik Amaya of Comic Book Resources wrote that "[t]he film's biggest faults lie in how far it strays from the source" and that "[i]f you've ever seen any movie about leather-clad assassins, you already know how this film plays out. The speed and skill of the movie-making balance out those faults, however." Tom McLean of Newsarama noted that, while the story deviated strongly from the source, the movie "stands out as a highly entertaining action film that preserves the comic's core premise and cheeky attitude while taking the story into very different but still satisfying territory."

Among European critics, Peter Bradshaw of The Guardian wrote that the film "looks as if it has been written by a committee of 13-year-old boys for whom penetrative sex is still only a rumour, and the resulting movie plays like a party political broadcast on behalf of the misogynist party", concluding, "In an ideal world, the title would have the word 'Not' tacked on to the front." Kim Newman, writing in Empire, praised Bekmambetov as "the most exciting action-oriented émigré since John Woo" and commented that the film's gruesome violence "hint[s] at the comic's uncomfortable suggestion that escapism is merely a licence to become monstrous."

Accolades

Possible sequel
Even before the film's release, Mark Millar announced director Timur Bekmambetov was planning a sequel, though Millar denied that he would write a sequel to the comic book. He was instead creating a story along with the producers, that would follow the first film's idea of an international guild of assassins.  Terence Stamp described Pekwarsky as "something that's written for a sequel", and Common expressed interest in a prequel, feeling that both The Gunsmith and Fox deserved more exposition.

Chris Morgan would return to write the sequel's screenplay, but departed in April 2009 due to "excessive workload", leaving the task to Evan Spiliotopoulos. In June 2009, Bekmambetov said that pre-production for Wanted 2 was about to get started, with filming scheduled to begin in late fall or winter. The film will have a reported budget of $150 million and will be shot in the United States, India, and Russia. He also added that some of the characters would resurrect, particularly Fox and The Exterminator. On September, the director added that even without a finished script Bazelevs had already done previsualization of the action scenes. In 2010, after reports that Angelina Jolie had pulled out of the sequel, Millar said that the script would be rewritten to remove Fox's return, so production could start that year for a late 2011 release. Eventually the production did not take off, leading Bekmambetov to work on Abraham Lincoln: Vampire Hunter instead.

In a 2011 Q&A, producer Jim Lemley said that "Wanted 2 sounds like it will not happen any time soon if at all". That same year, James McAvoy said, regarding the sequel, "I think the studio is keen to make it, and we really want to make it, but we want to make it if it's right and when it's right, and that might not be ever." McAvoy also expressed interest in a sequel focusing on a character other than Wesley. Universal later brought Wanted screenwriters Michael Brandt and Derek Haas to write the sequel, which Haas described as happening "right after the events that just happened; it'll pick up Wesley a few years later and go back in for another round", while also being "Fox-less and loom-less." Haas would later detail that the script featured a new female protagonist, who Wesley would recruit "sort of in the Fox role." Bekmambetov declared during the interviews for Abraham Lincoln: Vampire Hunter that after many years of indecision as the Wanted sequel stalled in development, he proposed an idea to the screenwriters wherein the plot followed Wesley while featuring "a great twist."

McAvoy declared that since he "had a blast making the first Wanted", he would make a sequel regardless of the quality of the script; however, he also acknowledged that the extended time the film spent in development "suggests to me that they're not finding it very easy to come up with a story that they're passionate about, so we'll have to wait and see." In 2014, McAvoy acknowledged that a potential sequel has been in the talks, saying he "had a couple of versions of script thrown my way" while adding that Universal is still waiting for the right screenplay. In June 2020, Bekmambetov expressed renewed interest in a sequel, perhaps as a computer screen film  because "I cannot imagine an assassin in today's world would run with a gun. Why? He will use drones, he will use computer technology, probably."

See also
 Norns, who "twine the threads of fate"

References

External links

 
 

2008 films
English-language Russian films
2008 action thriller films
German action thriller films
American action thriller films
English-language German films
Films based on Image Comics
Films directed by Timur Bekmambetov
Films set in Chicago
Films shot in Budapest
Films shot in Chicago
Films shot in the Czech Republic
Films shot in Prague
Films about infidelity
Films about secret societies
Relativity Media films
Spyglass Entertainment films
Universal Pictures films
Films about murderers
Films based on works by Mark Millar
Films based on Top Cow Productions
Films scored by Danny Elfman
Films produced by Marc E. Platt
Fiction about assassinations
Films with screenplays by Chris Morgan
Live-action films based on comics
Bazelevs Company films
2000s English-language films
2000s American films
2000s German films